The Magic Triangle is an album by American jazz pianist Don Pullen, saxophonist Joseph Jarman and drummer Don Moye recorded in 1979 for the Italian Black Saint label.

Reception
The Allmusic review by Scott Yanow awarded the album 4½ stars stating "The four group originals, although sometimes using themes, are quite spontaneous and most noteworthy for the interplay between the unpredictable Jarman and the powerful pianist. Mostly for very open-eared listeners".

Track listing
All compositions by Don Pullen except as indicated
 "Lonely Child" (Joseph Jarman) - 14:34 
 "J.F.M. - 3 Way Blues" (Don Moye) - 5:41 
 "Hippy Dippy" - 9:23 
 "What Was Ain't" - 10:48
Recorded at Barigozzi Studio in Milano, Italy on July 24–26, 1979

Personnel
Don Pullen - piano, vocals
Joseph Jarman - flute, alto flute, piccolo, tenor saxophone, alto saxophone, clarinet
Famoudou Don Moye - drums, congas

References

Black Saint/Soul Note albums
Don Pullen albums
Joseph Jarman albums
1979 albums